Portrait of the Artist as a Young Ram is the second and final studio album by American rock band Ram Jam, released in 1978. It was re-released in 2006 on Rock Candy Records. The title is a play on James Joyce's semi-autobiographical novel A Portrait of the Artist as a Young Man.

Track listing

Personnel
Myke Scavone – vocals, percussion
Jimmy Santoro – lead guitar
Bill Bartlett – rhythm guitar, vocals
Howie Blauvelt – bass guitar
Peter Charles – drums

Production
Producer: Jeffry Katz/Jerry Kasenetz
Engineer: Barry Magaliff
Engineer assistant: Steve Goldman

References

Ram Jam albums
1978 albums
Epic Records albums
Albums produced by Jerry Kasenetz
Albums produced by Jeffry Katz